Orius majusculus  is a Palearctic species of  true bug It is predatory.

References
 

Anthocoridae
Hemiptera of Europe
Insects described in 1879